Unitised insurance funds or unit-linked insurance funds are a form of collective investment offered life assurance policies.

An insurance company's contract may offer a choice of unit-linked funds to invest in. Insurers that offer these contracts are mainly found in the UK and British Isles offshore financial centres.  All types of life assurance and insurers pension plans, both single premium and regular premium policies offer these funds. They facilitate access to wide range and types of assets for different types of investors.

The range of fund choice for investment has grown significantly in recent years with the increased trend to provide unit-linked alternatives to popular unit trust and OEIC funds styled as externally managed funds as opposed to the life assurance companies internally managed funds. Typically the externally managed fund links have higher charges; this is tolerated as the expectation is for better returns.

Nature of funds
The funds are open-ended investments made available through life assurance companies. Unlike most collective investments, there is no independent body tasked with safeguarding the assets. The company may manage, promote and hold the assets on behalf of the policyholders. The policyholders have rights to the assets but do not own the units, nor are they readily redeemable.

This said, in practice life insurance companies tend to be well–regulated and depend on their reputation which ensures consumer confidence when investing.

See also 
 Unit Linked Insurance Plan

References

External links
 Financial Conduct Authority (FCA) – regulates the conduct of life assurance companies in the UK.

Investment funds